.tr is the Internet country code top-level domain (ccTLD) for Turkey. It is administered by trABİS (under the Information and Communication Technologies Authority of Turkey) and managed by the Computer Center DNS Group of the ICT Authority. The domain was formerly administered by NIC.tr and managed by the Turkey Internet Society (the local chapter of ISOC) until September 2022.

.nc.tr and .ct.tr are used as second-level domains for the Turkish Republic of Northern Cyprus, which is a self declared state and not recognised by the United Nations, and as such has no country code assigned.

Statistics 

As of March 2017, around 15.53% of all the .tr domains were served via secured HTTPS protocol, with the Let's Encrypt Authority X3 being the most popular SSL certificate. Microsoft-IIS is the most popular web server, serving 35.31% of the .tr domains, followed by Apache serving 35.14% of the total .tr domains.

Domains

Second-level 
nic.tr, formerly the official registry's domain, is the only second-level domain under this TLD. However, current registry TRABIS states that, restricted registrations directly at the second level will start one year after their incorporation date, which is 14 September 2022.

Third-level 
Several third-level domains are present under .tr:

 gov.tr (reserved for the Government of Turkey and state institutions/organizations)
 mil.tr (reserved for the Turkish Armed Forces; retired in 2010 and replaced by tsk.tr)
 tsk.tr (reserved for the Turkish Armed Forces; used since 2010)
 k12.tr (reserved for schools approved by the Ministry of National Education)
 edu.tr (reserved for higher education institutions approved by the Council of Higher Education)
 av.tr (reserved for freelance lawyers, law firms and attorney partnerships)
 dr.tr (reserved for medical doctors, medical partnerships, hospitals, and healthcare services)
 bel.tr (reserved for provincial, district, and town municipal organizations and governments)
 pol.tr (reserved for the General Directorate of Security and police)
 kep.tr (reserved for Registered Electronic Mail Service Providers [KEPHS] authorized by the Information and Communication Technologies Authority)
 com.tr (intended for commercial entities)
 net.tr (reserved for network operators/providers, as well as internet-related access services such as portals, e-mail, etc)
 org.tr (reserved for nonprofit entities such as foundations, associations, and non-governmental organizations)
 info.tr (intended for informational websites)
 bbs.tr (reserved for entities providing BBS services)
 nom.tr (reserved for individual/personal use)
 tv.tr (reserved for entities in the television industry)
 biz.tr (intended for commercial entities)
 tel.tr (reserved for use in connection with Turkish telephone numbers)
 gen.tr (general use)
 web.tr (general use)
 name.tr (reserved for individual/personal use)

External links 
 IANA .tr whois information

See also 
 Country code top-level domain
 Telecommunications in Turkey
 Internet in Turkey

References 

Communications in Turkey
Country code top-level domains
Internet in Turkey
Mass media in Turkey
Council of European National Top Level Domain Registries members
Computer-related introductions in 1990